Most major universities in China are known colloquially by an abbreviated form of their names. For example, Peking University, whose Chinese name is "běijīng dàxué" (lit. Beijing University) is normally just referred to as "běidà", taking the first syllable of each word "běi" + "dà". The full names, which are much longer, are typically only used in formal communications.

Notes

References